Smith River is a tributary of the Missouri River, in central Montana, in the United States. It rises in  southern Meagher County in the Castle Mountains and flows northwest in the valley between the Big Belt and Little Belt mountains, past White Sulphur Springs and past Smith River State Park.

The Smith is a Class I river from the Camp Baker Fishing Access site near Ft. Logan to its confluence with the Missouri River for public access for recreational purposes.

Noted for its spectacular scenery and blue-ribbon trout fishery, the Smith River is unique in that it has only one public put-in and one public take-out for the entire  segment of river. Boat camps located along the remote river canyon help preserve the unique quality of this area. The Smith River between Camp Baker and Eden Bridge is the only river corridor managed by Montana Fish, Wildlife & Parks as a permitted river. Permits for private floats on the Smith River are allocated to the public via a lottery system prior to the spring season. Permit applications are typically available the first week of January each year, with an application deadline of mid-February.

Areas near the Smith River are currently under review as nearby Meagher County and state agencies investigate construction of the Black Butte Copper Project.

See also

List of rivers of Montana
Montana Stream Access Law

Notes

External links

Rivers of Montana
Tributaries of the Missouri River
Rivers of Cascade County, Montana
Rivers of Meagher County, Montana